Gunnison County is a county located in the U.S. state of Colorado. As of the 2020 census, the population was 16,918. The county seat is Gunnison. The county was named for John W. Gunnison, a United States Army officer and captain in the Army Topographical Engineers, who surveyed for the transcontinental railroad in 1853.

History
Archeological studies have dated the Ute people's appearance in the Uncompahgre region of Colorado as early as 1150 A.D. Possibilities exist that they are descendants of an earlier people living in the area as far back as 1500 B.C. They were a nomadic people moving about the Western Slope of Colorado in the various parts of the year. In the early to mid-1600s the Spaniards of New Mexico introduced the horse which changed their patterns of hunting taking them across the divide to the eastern slopes and into conflict with the Plains Indians which soon became their bitter enemies.

The first recorded expedition of Western Colorado wilderness was led by Don Juan Rivera in 1765. In 1776, two Spanish priests, Fathers Escalante and Domínguez, led a party into the area around Montrose and Paonia.

The 1830s brought the mountainmen into the area to trap beaver. An old cabin located on Cochetopa Creek discovered by Sidney Jocknick was most likely built between 1830 and 1840 and a crude fort was discovered on a tributary of Tomichi Creek bore signs of a conflict.

In 1853, Capt. John W. Gunnison surveyed the area for the transcontinental railroad route.

In 1858 gold was discovered near Denver bringing the white man across the divide into the western slope in search of the precious metal. In 1859 a party settled on Texas Gulch in Union Park.

Placer gold was found at Washington Gulch in 1861 as part of the Colorado Gold Rush.

In 1861 the Territory of Colorado was organized. The territorial governor was made ex officio Superintentant of Indian Affairs. A conference on October 1, 1863, established a boundary line for a reservation. This treaty averted a possible dangerous situation by giving the Utes some cattle and sheep, a blacksmith and 20,000 dollars a year in goods and provisions. The government failed to fulfill any these obligations straining the relations further. The treaty of 1868 recognized Chief Ouray as the sole spokesman for seven tribes of the Ute People. He held this power over his people through diplomacy and understanding.

The Los Pinos Agency was developed through the Treaties of 1868 and 1873. The first agent was 2nd Lieutenant Calvin T. Speer. In 1871 a cow camp was started near the present site of Gunnison with James P. Kelley in charge. In this year, Jabez Nelson Trask, a Harvard grad, relieved Speer as agent upon orders from Governor Edward M. McCook. In 1872 Trask was replaced by Charles Adams.

In 1875 orders from Washington to move the agency to the Uncomphgre Valley were completed in November.

In 1876 Colorado entered the Union and Gunnison County was formed. 1879 was a year of expansion due to the miners, speculators and adventurers seeking wealth. The cattle industry was established by 1880. The short growing season was not conducive to farming and the ranchers had to level fields and construct irrigation ditches to water the fields for hay.

Geography
It is the fifth-largest county by area in Colorado. The county seat is Gunnison, Colorado which is located in a wide valley at the confluence of Tomichi Creek and Gunnison River. The county rests in the Gunnison Basin formed by the Continental Divide to the east, Collegiate Peaks Wilderness rises in the northeast, Maroon Bells–Snowmass Wilderness and the White River National Forest to the north, the West Elk Wilderness rises in the west of the county with Delta and Montrose Counties on its western slopes. The Uncompahgre Wilderness rises in the southwest of the county and the Powderhorn Wilderness east of there and Saquache County being south of Gunnison county eastward over to Marshall Pass southeast of the county.

Taylor Park Reservoir is a man-made lake created by the Taylor Dam constructed in 1934 with appropriations of 2,725,000 dollars.

Adjacent counties

Pitkin County, Colorado — north
Chaffee County, Colorado — east
Saguache County, Colorado — southeast
Hinsdale County, Colorado — south
Ouray County, Colorado — southwest
Delta County, Colorado — west
Montrose County, Colorado — west
Mesa County, Colorado — northwest

Major highways
  U.S. Highway 50
  State Highway 92
  State Highway 114
  State Highway 133
  State Highway 135
  State Highway 149

Demographics

2000
As of the census of 2000, there were 13,956 people, 5,649 households, and 2,965 families residing in the county.  The population density was 4 people per square mile (2/km2).  There were 9,135 housing units at an average density of 3 per square mile (1/km2).  The racial makeup of the county was 95.08% White, 0.49% Black or African American, 0.70% Native American, 0.54% Asian, 0.04% Pacific Islander, 1.44% from other races, and 1.72% from two or more races.  5.02% of the population were Hispanic or Latino of any race.

There were 5,649 households, out of which 24.10% had children under the age of 18 living with them, 44.20% were married couples living together, 5.40% had a female householder with no husband present, and 47.50% were non-families. 27.20% of all households were made up of individuals, and 4.60% had someone living alone who was 65 years of age or older.  The average household size was 2.30 and the average family size was 2.84.

In the county, the age demographic is distributed, with 17.90% under the age of 18, 21.10% from 18 to 24, 32.90% from 25 to 44, 21.20% from 45 to 64, and 6.90% who were 65 years of age or older.  The median age was 30 years. For every 100 females there were 118.30 males.  For every 100 females age 18 and over, there were 120.90 males.

The median income for a household in the county was $36,916, and the median income for a family was $51,950. Males had a median income of $30,885 versus $25,000 for females. The per capita income for the county was $21,407.  About 6.00% of families and 15.00% of the population were below the poverty line, including 9.40% of those under age 18 and 7.20% of those age 65 or over.

2010
The total population for Gunnison County in the year 2010 was 15,324. There were 8,306 males and 7,018 females. The median age was 35.7 years old. Of the races, 14,152 were white, 92.4 percent; 1,255 were Hispanic or Latino (of any race), 8.2 percent; 510 claimed other race, 3.3 percent; 208 were American Indian and Alaska Native, 1.4 percent; 100 were Asian, 0.7 percent.

Total households were 6,516, 100.0 percent; Family households (families) 3,454, 53.0 percent, ("Family households" were based on a householder and one or more other people related to the householder by birth, marriage, or adoption. Same-sex married couples were not included.)

Occupied housing units consisted of 6,516 units, being 100.0 percent, with 3,900 or 59.9 percent being owner-occupied housing units; 2,616 or 40.1 percent being renters.

There were estimated 9,155 employed persons and 459 unemployed. 4,601 people drove to work alone and 1,027 car-pooled; 1,297 people walked to work and 1,052 took other means. Management, business, science, and arts occupations included 2,895 persons; Service occupations included 1,828 persons; Sales and office occupations included 2,192 persons; Natural resources, construction, and maintenance occupations included 1,635 persons; Production, transportation, and material moving occupations included 605 persons. 6,635 people were private wage and salary workers; 1,865 people were government workers; 655 people were self-employed and 49,356 dollars was the median household income and 67,333 dollars was the mean household income.

Recreation

State parks
Paonia State Park

National recreation areas
Curecanti National Recreation Area

National forests
Gunnison National Forest
White River National Forest

National wilderness areas
Collegiate Peaks Wilderness
Fossil Ridge Wilderness
Maroon Bells-Snowmass Wilderness
Powderhorn Wilderness
Raggeds Wilderness
Uncompahgre Wilderness
West Elk Wilderness

Trails
American Discovery Trail
Colorado Trail
Continental Divide National Scenic Trail
Old Spanish National Historic Trail

Bicycle routes
Great Parks Bicycle Route
Western Express Bicycle Route

Scenic byways
West Elk Loop Scenic Byway
Silver Thread Scenic Byway

Politics
For most of the 20th century, except 1964, Gunnison County was a Republican stronghold. However, beginning in the late 1980s, it began trending more Democratic, as Bill Clinton won the county both times in 1992 and 1996. The county gave a 43.2% plurality to George W. Bush in the 2000 election, and has voted for the Democratic candidate in every election since.

Libraries

Communities

City
Gunnison

Towns
Crested Butte
Marble
Mount Crested Butte
Pitkin

Census Designated Place 

 Somerset

Unincorporated communities
Almont
Doyleville
Ohio City
Parlin
Powderhorn
Sapinero
Tincup

Ghost towns
Aberdeen
Baldwin
Crystal
Iola
Pittsburg
Vulcan

In popular culture
In 2007, the science fiction horror film Aliens vs. Predator: Requiem was set in and around the town of Gunnison.

See also

Outline of Colorado
Index of Colorado-related articles
National Register of Historic Places listings in Gunnison County, Colorado

References

Bibliography

External links
Gunnison County official website
Gunnison-Crested Butte Tourism Association
"Colorado County Evolution", by Don Stanwyck
Colorado Historical Society

 

 
Colorado counties
1877 establishments in Colorado
Populated places established in 1877